Warframe is a free-to-play action role-playing third-person shooter multiplayer online game developed and published by Digital Extremes. First released for Windows personal computers in March 2013, it was later ported to PlayStation 4 in November 2013, Xbox One in September 2014, Nintendo Switch in November 2018, PlayStation 5 in November 2020, and Xbox Series X/S in April 2021. Support for cross-platform play was released in 2022. Cross-save, as well as ports to mobile devices, is planned for 2023. The game is in a perpetual open beta.

In Warframe, players control members of the Tenno, a race of ancient warriors who have awoken from centuries of suspended animation far into Earth's future to find themselves at war in the planetary system with different factions. The Tenno use their powered Warframes along with a variety of weapons and abilities to complete missions. While many of the game's missions use procedurally-generated levels, it also includes large open world areas similar to other massively multiplayer online games, as well as some story-specific missions with fixed level design. The game includes elements of shooting and melee games, parkour, and role-playing to allow players to advance their Tenno with improved gear. The game includes both player versus environment and player versus player elements. It is supported by microtransactions, which lets players purchase in-game items using real money, but also offers the option to earn them at no cost through grinding.

The concept for Warframe originated in 2000, when Digital Extremes began work on a new game titled Dark Sector. At the time, the company had been successful in supporting other developers and publishers, and wanted to develop their own game in-house. Dark Sector suffered several delays and was eventually released in 2008, having used some of the initial framework but far different from the original plan. By 2012, in the wake of the success of free-to-play games, the developers took their earlier Dark Sector ideas and art assets and incorporated them into a new project, their self-published Warframe.

Initially, the growth of Warframe was slow, hindered by moderate critical reviews and low player counts. Since its release, the game has experienced positive growth. The game is one of Digital Extremes' most successful titles, seeing nearly 50 million registered players by 2019.

Setting
Set in the future, players control members of the Tenno, a race of ancient warriors who have awoken from a millennia-long cryosleep as they awake again on Earth without memories of their past. In the Origin System (in-game term for the Solar System), they find themselves at war with the Grineer, a matriarchal race of militarized and deteriorated human clones built upon metal, blood, and war; the Corpus, a mega-corporation with advanced robotics and laser technology built upon profit; the Infested, disfigured victims of the Technocyte virus; the Corrupted, brainwashed Grineer, Corpus, and Infested units defending ancient Orokin towers; and the Sentients, a race of self-replicating machines made by a long-dead transhuman race known as the Orokin. The Lotus, the Tenno's mysterious guide, helps the player through difficult situations, as well as gives hints which help them defeat enemies. To fight back, the Tenno use bio-mechanical suits, the eponymous Warframes, to channel their unique abilities.

All of the factions encountered in the game, including the Tenno, were created by or are splinter groups of the old Orokin Empire, which the Tenno learns was an ancient fallen civilization and former reigning power in the Origin System. Although most of them are long dead by the time of the Tenno's awakening, their lingering presence can be still be felt throughout the Origin System. Before their fall, the Orokin had realized the Origin System was becoming dangerously depleted of resources, and their solution to keep their empire alive was to colonize new star systems. The Orokin sent out colony ships through the Void, a trans-dimensional space that enabled fast travel between stellar systems. They had also sent out the Sentients beforehand, to arrive in these systems first, and terraform them, so the colonists would arrive to garden worlds, capable of supporting human life. None of these residential ships returned, and those they had loaded with Sentients returned with the Sentients now deciding to wipe out the Orokin, leading to the Old War, the creation of the Tenno, and finally, the collapse of the Empire.

In the game's "The Second Dream" quest, which was introduced in December 2015, the player discovers that the Lotus is a Sentient being known as Natah, rebelling against the Sentient to protect the Tenno, desiring to have her own surrogate children after losing her ability to procreate. The Lotus' father, Hunhow, sends a vengeful assassin called the Stalker to Lua (the remains of Earth's Moon), which the Lotus had hidden in the Void, to find its secret. The Lotus dispatches the Tenno there to stop the Stalker, arriving too late as the Stalker unveils the entity that the Lotus had protected: a human child known as the Operator, who is the real Tenno controlling the Warframes through the course of the game. The Operator is one of several human children that survived the passage of the Zariman Ten Zero colony ship through the Void, the adults having all gone mad from its travel. When the ship returned to the Orokin Empire, the children had all been put to sleep for thousands of years, outlasting the fall of the Empire, to be found by the Lotus and becoming the Tenno (Tenno short for the "Ten Zero" of the ship's name). The power of the Void gave these children the power of Transference to be able to control the Warframes, making them the powerful weapons in battling the ongoing forces in the Origin System. From this point forward, the player can then engage in missions both as the Warframe and the Operator.

Throughout various updates, various quest have been released after the Second Dream that elaborate on the story. "The War Within" quest introduced the Grineer Queens, rulers of the Grineer, and their asteroid-based Kuva Fortress, also giving the Operator the ability to act fully on their own as another playable entity, rather than a single-use attack. Quests afterward would introduce figures such as "The Man In The Wall," a mysterious entity, presumably from the Void, who takes on the visage of whoever sees them, most often as the playable Operator, and Ballas, one of the last living Orokin, assumed to be responsible for creating the Warframes.

Gameplay
Warframe is an online action game that includes elements of shooters, RPG, and stealth games.

The player starts out with a silent pseudo-protagonist in the form of an anthropomorphous biomechanical combat unit called 'Warframe' possessing supernatural agility and special abilities, a selection of basic weapons (primary, secondary and melee) and a space ship called an 'Orbiter', which has an A.I  named 'Ordis' who will refer to the player as 'Operator'. The player's primary goal from this point is to explore the Origin System. Later in the course of the game, the player unlocks the ability to gain direct control of the 'Operator', which is the true Tenno protagonist in physical form (and no longer silent). The Operator is able to physically manifest themselves in the environment by projecting out of the Warframe, and disappear by resuming control of it (a process called 'Transference'), and possesses abilities of their own. Subsequent to that, the Operator is able to Transference into a larger, purely mechanical combat unit called 'Necramech', which is the technological precursor to the Warframes. Players can engage in space-bound combat using an auxiliary combat platform called 'Archwing', mounted on a Warframe, which comes with a unique set of abilities. Necramechs and Archwings (in space combat) do not use Warframe weapons, but heavy weapons called 'Archguns', which can be upgraded to be used by Warframes.. Late in 2019, an update was introduced to the game letting players pilot and manage a distinct space ship called 'Railjack', which is a combat vessel unlike the Orbiter. This was designed as a co-op experience with up to four people working together, performing different tasks to keep the ship operational while destroying enemy ships. A Railjack-focused update was released in 2021, which brought expanded content and a new skill tree aimed at making solo play more accessible.

Through the Orbiter's console, the player can select any of the available missions to them. In order to progress through the Solar System, players must complete Junctions to travel to other planets. These Junctions have a set of tasks that must be completed to access the Junction, where the player faces off against an NPC Warframe. Other missions rotate over time as part of the game's living universe; these can include missions with special rewards and community challenges to allow all players to reap benefits if they are successfully met. Aboard the ship, the player can also manage all other functions for their Tenno, including managing their arsenal of equipment, customizing their Warframe and weapons, crafting new equipment, and accessing the in-game store. Missions can be played alone or with up to four players in a player versus environment cooperative manner, and are generally played on randomly generated maps composed of "tiles" of map sections. Missions have various objectives, such as defeating a certain number of enemies (Exterminate), stealing data from terminals without raising enemy alarms (Spy), rescuing and escorting prisoners (Rescue), or defending points on the map for set periods of time (Defense). Later updates have added three large open-field environments where numerous bounties can be completed.

Players can use their weapons, abilities, and a number of parkour style moves to navigate through and overpower forces within the mission. Downed players may choose to revive themselves up to a maximum of four times, or can be revived by other players an infinite number of times. Once complete, players are rewarded with in-game items, as well as in-game currency and items picked up while exploring the map; failure to complete a mission causes these rewards to be lost. In addition to cooperative missions, the game includes player versus player (PvP) content through the multiplayer 'Conclave', which also rewards the player for placing high in such matches.

Players and their equipment also gain experience and level up from missions; equipment with higher levels support more 'Mods', abstracted upgrades (presented as cards in the game's UI) that can be slotted into the equipment to change its attributes or provide beneficial, or sometimes negative, bonuses and abilities. Mods are dropped by enemies during missions and may be part of the rewards, and are generally given out following a rarity distribution, with more powerful mods being more elusive to acquire. The most advanced weapon Mods, called 'Riven Mods,' have randomized stats, based on a prefix/suffix system characteristic of ARPGs. Alongside mods, players have other means of improving their equipment, including conditional upgrades called Arcane Enhancements and, for a few weapons, fusing an item with another of its kind to get a superior version. Another type of reward is equipment blueprints, which can be used to construct new Warframe parts or weapons; blueprints and their resulting equipment may also be purchased directly using Platinum, the game's premium currency that can be traded for with other players for rare items in-game, or be purchased via microtransactions. Players need to have specific quantities of construction resources (found from missions and their rewards) to build these items.

Warframe is designed to be free-to-play, and has avoided using pay to win elements; all Warframes, weapons, and other non-cosmetic equipment can be acquired in-game over time through normal gameplay, which may involve grinding. Spending the in-game currency can simplify and quicken the process. New weapons, Warframes, equipment, blueprints to construct such equipment, and cosmetics like skins and capes (called 'Syandanas') can be purchased in the market, using either Credits, which are earned in-game, or Platinum. Some cosmetic items can only be obtained through in-game payments. However, some indirect upgrades can only be bought with Platinum, such as arsenal slots for Warframes, weapons, and certain other equipment, though they can be unlocked via a "Nightwave" battle pass-esque reward system, which is completely free.

Development

Dark Sector as a precursor
The origins of Warframe came out of Canadian studio Digital Extremes' original vision for their previous game Dark Sector. Prior to that point, Digital Extremes was known as a work-for-hire studio, working alongside other studios to help complete development; this included working with Epic Games for Unreal Tournament (1999) and its sequels Unreal Tournament 2003 and Unreal Tournament 2004. Epic had looked to bring Digital Extremes into their studio, but found there would be issues with the Canadian government that interfered with the merger, and the studios agreed to go their separate ways.

Wanting to establish themselves as a lead studio, Digital Extremes came up with the idea of Dark Sector, which they first announced in February 2000, describing the game as combining "the intense action elements of Unreal Tournament with the scope and character evolution of a persistent online universe". In early interviews, Digital Extremes said that the gameplay for Dark Sector would have had players as bounty hunters and assassins in a dark science fiction setting, with each character having a bounty on their head, making them targets for other players.

The studio used their vision of Dark Sector to try to secure a publisher, but this only led to more offers for work-for-hire. The company remained quiet on Dark Sector for about four years, re-announcing in early 2004 a revised Dark Sector, now to be a stylish, science-fiction single player experience with stealth elements inspired by the Metal Gear Solid series, and a story they considered a mix of Metal Gear Solid and The Dark Crystal set in space, within a larger setting like that of Frank Herbert's Dune universe. Much of the game's art style was informed by the French artist Jean Giraud, aka Moebius. The player-character, belonging to a race called the Tenno, and enemies would wear high-tech suits that would give them unique abilities. This re-announcement included a scripted demo to show their vision of the game's gameplay and graphics. The game was announced just as both the first consoles of the seventh generation, the Xbox 360 and PlayStation 3, had been teased, and Digital Extremes started to look for a publisher to release the games on these platforms. The game received a good deal of attention from its video, including coverage by CNN on the upcoming console generation.

Digital Extremes' creative director Steve Sinclair spent about a year on the road following the re-announcement of Dark Sector to find a publisher, but most rejected the idea; Sinclair said most publishers were not impressed with the science fiction setting, and instead encouraged them to change the setting to modern-day, within World War II (which was popular at the time due to the Call of Duty series), and even the American Civil War. When Sinclair returned to the studio, they tried to rework the setting, even trying a superhero genre, without luck. Matters were complicated as they were also attempting to develop their own engine, the Evolution engine, to support the game and the new consoles, switching away from the familiar Unreal Engine. Ultimately, Digital Extremes dropped most of the science fiction elements, and moved the gameplay towards a more Resident Evil survivor-horror approach. Digital Extremes did keep one element of the original concept for the released game, that being the protagonist named "Tenno". The Dark Sector released in 2008 was far different from their original vision. Dark Sector received average reviews, and was not a major financial windfall for the studio, leading them back to doing work for hire over the next four years, including BioShock, BioShock 2, Homefront, and The Darkness 2.

Production
Around 2011, Digital Extremes were finding themselves struggling for work-for-hire contracts. While the studio had been forced to issue some layoffs, they were still at about 250 people at this time. Looking again to develop their own IP and to try to take advantage of the growth in free-to-play games, Digital Extremes looked back to the original Dark Sector concept from 2004 and looked to develop it as a free-to-play game. This decision was made in early 2012 and required the team to create a prototype within one to two months, as Sinclair and Digital Extremes' CEO James Schmalz were going to shop the game around to publishers at that year's Game Developers Conference in March 2012. They took several assets from the abandoned 2004 concept, and developed this as Warframe. At GDC, Sinclair and Schmalz found publishers still cold on the idea: Western publishers were not keen on the science fiction setting, while a large unnamed Korean publisher warned him that they would "fail" as Western developers did not know how to properly support free-to-play games with quality content. Another concern raised by these publishers was that Warframe was based on player-versus-environmental gameplay, which differed significantly with other free-to-play titles at the time that were mostly player-versus-player. Disheartened, they returned to the studio and decided that they would publish Warframe on their own. They built out a playable version of the game, at the time known as Lotus in about nine months. Alongside this, the studio developed the necessary server architecture to support the game and the microtransaction system they had envisioned for it.

Status

Original release
Warframe was publicly announced in June 2012 with its closed beta launched in October 2012. Player feedback helped to refine the game's structure. An early change in the beta in early 2013 was their monetization scheme to avoid pay to win scenarios. For example, initially, each Warframe had a skill tree that the player could unlock completely through missions and gaining experience. An extended version of the tree was available if the player augmented the Warframe with an in-game item, then only purchasable through microtransactions. When players complained about this feature, they stripped the pay to win elements and adopted the mantra of keeping the game as free to play, requiring that players did not have to spend any money to get an item within the game. To support the game, they borrowed the idea of offering for sale "Founder's Packs" that would grant in-game items and currency, an idea that had been successfully used on Kickstarter projects.

Digital Extremes found it difficult to get attention from the press as around 2012–2013, free to play games were typically shunned by game journalists. Unfavorable comparisons had been made to Destiny, a highly anticipated title due out in 2014, that also tarnished Warframes presence. Coupled with low player counts, Digital Extremes were not sure how long they could continue supporting the game. However, Digital Extremes found they had a small but dedicated group of players that latched onto the title, buying into the game through Founder's Packs, telling their friends about the game, and interacting with the developers to provide feedback which was integrated into the game's design. Further, they discovered that when popular streamers like TotalBiscuit covered the beta, they drew more players to the game.

The open beta for Warframe launched in March 2013 for the Windows platform, with the game available from their own server systems. Warframe was released at the same time that the studio was also completing development for the April 2013 Star Trek game to tie into the release of the film Star Trek Into Darkness. The Star Trek game was critically panned, leading to financial hardships at the studio and forcing them to lay off developers. Warframe itself was not a critical hit with gaming publications, receiving average reviews; as IGN reviewed in 2013, the game was "fun, but a little bland".

Digital Extremes was planning to release Warframe for the PlayStation 4 as well, but that console was not available until November 2013, so to try to get more players, they decided to offer the game on Steam, which further grew the player base. Some days after the Steam launch, Digital Extremes had been able to start drawing in enough funding to maintain the viability of the studio. The PlayStation 4 version was released at the console's launch in November 2013, The Xbox One version of the game launched on September 2, 2014. The PS4 version was ported to Japan on February 22, 2014, followed by the Xbox One version on September 2, 2014.

Perpetual beta

Once the game turned profitable, Digital Extremes found themselves in the position of needing to generate content for the game to maintain its audience. Because they retained their 250-person staff throughout this process, they were able to expand upon content quickly, and soon hired in another 250 developers for Warframe. Community input was critical for Digital Extremes for new content and improvements. One major change after release was an update to the game's movement system, titled "Parkour 2.0", that was released in 2015. They had found before this, players discover ways to rapidly traverse levels by a trick known as "coptering" using specific weapons, Warframes, and upgrades. Though Digital Extremes had considered these movements to be game-breaking and considered removing the abilities altogether, they realized players liked to have exotic moves like this available to them, and thus created the Parkour 2.0 system that, while reining in how extensive these moves could be, fully supported the type of ninja-like movements that players wanted. Another example was a short-lived feature that allowed players to spend a small amount of the premium in-game currency Platinum to get a random color that they could use for customization. Players reacted negatively to this, as some found it would take a large amount of Platinum to get the color they wanted. Digital Extremes removed this random factor and instead added means to purchase such customization options directly.

The studio had found it important to release new content regularly to keep a stream of income from the game. They were also faced with the problem that to understand all of Warframes systems required some commitment by the player, and players that felt it was too much would wash out after a few hours. After many tries to make the game more appealing to new players, they still fail to do so.

In 2014, Digital Extremes was acquired by the Chinese investment company Leyou. Leyou since provides necessary funding for Digital Extremes to grow, but has little influence on the direction that the developers take Warframe.

The developers are intending to keep the game forever in a beta state.

Switch and ninth generation consoles
A Nintendo Switch version was announced in July 2018 and was ported by Panic Button, and was released on November 20, 2018. The various versions of Warframe currently support feature-limited cross-platform play, without the ability to transfer accounts. However, with each console release, Digital Extremes provides a temporary window to allow players on Windows to copy and transfer their accounts to the console version; these become separate accounts that progress separately on Windows and on the console.

As of December 2020, Leyou has been bought by the Chinese company Tencent for a $1.5 billion deal meaning that Digital Extremes is now owned by the Chinese company which also has stakes in Epic Games, Activision Blizzard and Ubisoft. Within the community of Warframe, voices of concern were outed by the acquisition and the possible meddling of Tencent in the continuation of the game. Digital Extremes published a statement explaining about the deal and the consequences and reassuring that the new ownership will not impact the game whatsoever.

Digital Extremes announced that they will bring Warframe to the PlayStation 5 and Xbox Series X and Series S upon their release in 2020.

Digital Extremes has implemented cross-platform play functionality across all computer and console platforms, planning support for cross-save functionality to allow users to play their same account on any version. In addition, they will also plan to release mobile versions of Warframe at the same time.

Expansions
Since release, Digital Extremes has supported Warframe with patches and expanded the game through major updates. These updates have included major gameplay overhauls, such as its "Melee 2.0" combat system to give players a wider array of combat moves, additional planets and missions, story elements, limited-time and seasonal events, and new gameplay modes, alongside regular addition of new Warframes, weapons, and other equipment to procure.

The Second Dream
In December 2015, Digital Extremes released Warframes first cinematic story quest, "The Second Dream". This quest features prominent characters from the game and introduces a new faction, the dreaded Sentients. Also, and most importantly, The Second Dream serves as an "Awakening" to the Tenno's true nature, as more than a mere Warframe, "more than human, but once a child, like any other". Completion of this quest grants access to a new game mechanic named Focus and allows the player to enter the battlefield as themselves, temporarily, through Transcendence. During Transcendence, the Warframe is temporarily deactivated, and a spectral form of the Tenno enters the battlefield, channeling one of five Focus Abilities, depending on which of the five Focus Schools the player chose during the quest's events.

The War Within
In November 2016, Warframes second cinematic quest was released, titled "The War Within". This quest sends the player on the chase for Teshin, the master and overseer of the Conclave, as he is seen suspiciously searching the pods of the newly awakened Tenno. Tracking Teshin across the Origin System leads to the discovery of the Kuva Fortress, a massive asteroid under Grineer control where the (so far only known as a legend) Twin Grineer Queens reside. The Queens are shown to have their origins as far back as the old Orokin Empire, and Teshin is revealed to be a Dax Soldier, meaning he was under their command due to them being of Orokin origin thus gaining the ability to wield the Kuva Scepter. The Queens cause an overload on the connection between Tenno and Warframe, forcing the Tenno to seek them out themselves, slowly discovering their Void powers. On the mission's climax, the Tenno unlocks Transference (which replaces Transcendence), an ability which allows them to roam independently of their Warframe at will, weakens the Elder Grineer Queen and has the option to kill her or "Let her rot", since all Grineer bodies decay over time due to excessive cloning. This quest also introduces a moral alignment system to the game, with possible options being Sun, Neutral and Moon. This alignment has so far not had any consequence in gameplay, leaving its purpose unknown.

Plains of Eidolon
An update to the game in November 2017, titled "Plains of Eidolon", added an open-world area to the game. The Plains are a semi-open world, initially accessible through a "hub" named Cetus, a settlement on Earth where a people named the Ostrons reside, then directly through the player's ship. As the game describes them, the Ostrons are "A tight-knit band of hucksters and merchants." This expansion added Warframes first open-world experience to the game, the ability for the player to gain reputation with the Ostrons, side-activities of fishing and mining, a Bounty system, consisting of five missions of ascending difficulty, where the player can choose to play any mission they would like regardless of whether the previous ones have been completed, a new quest named Saya's Vigil which rewarded the blueprint for the Warframe Gara, more customization options for the Tenno's combat pets, Kubrows (dogs) and Kavats (cats/ocelots), and the ability for the Tenno themselves to wield their own modular weapon, called an Amplifier (or Amp, for short) as well as another modular blade called a "Zaw". Finally, the "Plains of Eidolon" offer a new series of boss fights to the game: the titular Eidolons. These Sentient-origin titans require extreme gear and in most cases teamwork to take down for unique rewards.

The Sacrifice
An update to the game in June 2018, titled "The Sacrifice", added the third cinematic story to the game. Following on the events of Warframes previous cinematic story quests, The Second Dream and The War Within, The Sacrifice sends the Tenno on a hunt across the Origin System for a rogue Warframe known as Excalibur Umbra. This quest provides insight on Umbra's past, the ability to gain Umbra into arsenal after the quest's climactic point, and information on the origins of the Warframes themselves, answering multiple questions, but creating even more. The Sacrifice also features the alignment system introduced in "The War Within".

Fortuna
The expansion "Fortuna" was released on PC on November 8, 2018. The update focuses on the titular Fortuna Solaris Debt Internment Colony, which serves as a hub for the game's second open-world map, Orb Vallis. The people of Fortuna (known as the Solaris) were enslaved by a Corpus known as Nef Anyo who uses ancient Orokin devices that made gallons of coolant for the workstation and trade center on Venus. The area expands upon concepts introduced in Plains of Eidolon, along with new activities, and the ability to obtain a hoverboard-styled vehicle known as a K-Drive. This update also adds more modular items such as a plasma pistol called a "Kitgun", and a robotic companion called a "MOA".

Empyrean
The "Empyrean" update was revealed during TennoCon 2018 in July of that year and released on December 12, 2019. The update allowed players to construct a Railjack, an upgradeable spacecraft inspired by FTL: Faster Than Light. Players will be able to gain non-playable characters to populate the ship, customize the ship, and add upgrades. The Railjack can then be used in larger space-based missions, including space battles with enemy forces. Additionally, the game was planned to gain a system similar to the Nemesis system in Middle-earth: Shadow of Mordor, and feature boss characters that the player would fight multiple times, with the boss changing its armaments and tactics based on the past fights with the player. Empyrean update was released in 3 phases, with the first phase released on the PC build of the game on December 12, 2019.

The Old Blood
Warframes planned nemesis system was launched October 31, 2019 as the second phase of Empyrean, with the Nintendo Switch launch delayed to November 19, 2019. This update revealed the nemesis as a "Kuva Lich" - A once-ordinary Grineer grunt, turned super-soldier through infusion with a mystical resource named Kuva. This enemy establishes their influence over planets in the Origin System, builds a following of "Thralls" which can be defeated to reveal hints on how to defeat the Lich permanently, steals resources from the player if they finish a mission in Lich territory, and has unique personalities, weapons, appearances, and semi-randomly generated names and weaknesses, resistances, and immunities to different types of damage. A Lich can be generated in missions against the Grineer faction by performing an execution on a special enemy named a "Kuva Larvling". Said executions are performed with a newly introduced special weapon named the Parazon - a small blade attached to a rope equipped on the Warframe's wrist. The Parazon is also used to execute Thralls and specific enemies, for the game's Hacking minigame, and visually in some cutscenes. The Old Blood also introduced Grendel, the game's 42nd Warframe, together with his signature weapon. Two earlier Warframes, named Vauban and Ember, were adjusted to better function in the game's current state. Additionally, the game's "Melee 3.0" system had its release completed.

Warframe Revised 
Warframe Revised, a major quality of life update, was released on 20 May 2020. While it didn't add any new content, it served to improve existing gameplay by modifying key aspects of gameplay, such as revising the Kuva Lich system by improving progression speed and allowing players to preview the weapon their Lich would spawn with, allowing them to make a more informed choice as to whether or not to create a Lich, in addition to fixing a lot of bugs and problems associated with Railjack gameplay. It also added a brief invulnerability period for players after their energy shields were depleted, as well as modifying player health so that they no longer had weaknesses to certain damage types. One major part of the update was that it removed Warframe's controversial explosive self-damage system and replaced it with a temporary stagger mechanic depending on how close the player is to their own explosions. Self-damage was infamous for its tendency to instantly kill players without warning since it was based on the damage of the player's own weaponry, which in almost all cases was extremely high, a problem that only intensified when combined with the cramped nature of the game's procedurally generated tilesets.

Heart of Deimos 
Warframes third open-world update was announced via the game's official YouTube channel on July 20, 2020 and was released on August 25, 2020 for PC, PS4, and Xbox One, and on August 27, 2020 for Nintendo Switch. It is the game's first expansion to receive a simultaneous release across multiple platforms. The update adds Deimos, one of the two moons of Mars, as a new playable location within the game's Solar System. Deimos includes the Cambion Drift, an Infested open-world area that is smaller on the surface than the other two open-world areas but features procedurally generated underground tunnels. Much like the "Fortuna" and "Plains of Eidolon" updates, Deimos also contains a social hub called the Necralisk that houses the Entrati, an Orokin-era family known for creating the first technologies that could harness the power of the Void. Alongside Deimos came the introduction of the Helminth system, which adds the functionality for players to "infuse" new abilities on Warframes, including abilities from other Warframes. Additionally, the Heart of Deimos introduced Necramechs to the game, which are mech suits built and controlled by the player that feature their own unique abilities. Lastly, this expansion brought some improvements to the game's new player experience, mainly consisting of a reworked tutorial that includes a new cinematic intro film directed by Dan Trachtenberg, which first premiered at TennoCon 2019. The film was produced by Digic Pictures using a combination of motion capture and CGI.

Deimos Arcana
Warfame's Deimos expansion was released on November 19, 2020 for PC. It adds new weapons, and a new Necramech "Bonewidow". It was also planned to release with Lavos, an alchemist Warframe but was delayed due to Covid. It also added numerous quality of life changes and new setting options.

Warframe's second Deimos expansion was released on December 18, 2020 for PC, then was released on January 21, 2021 for Console. This was a one month event following the Tenno's victory and the Sentients' defeat in Operation: Scarlet Spear, Erra and the Sentients have retreated and gone into hiding. The second Sentient invasion in the Origin System thus begins, and the Orphix Sentient Units return, but this time they have been taught to override Warframes by deploying weaponized pulses cleverly designed to disable them, leaving the Necramechs as the Tenno's last option.

During the Operation, Natah transmits messages to the Tenno, revealing that she was the one who taught the Orphix to disable Warframes. Her messages about deploying the Orphix series, containing a letter followed by a number, reveal a code from ordering the numbers, which says: "I AM DYING".

Father in the Necralisk on Deimos will have a shop where players can spend their earned Phasic Cells, including a brand-new Warframe, his helmet, and his weapon, new Necramech mods and cosmetics, and items.

Corpus Proxima
The Corpus Proxima expansion was released on March 19, 2021. It aimed to simplify the Railjack component of the game by making it easier to acquire a ship with fewer components, eliminate the need to have a Clan Dojo, and the ability to buy a complete Railjack from the game's stores. It also included additional Railjack missions through additional sectors/planets. Players could also recruit crewmates for their Railjacks to man the ship's guns or maintain the ship while the player is away, as well as train them for specific tasks and give them their own weapons. Three new Proxima regions were added to the Railjack system: Neptune, Pluto and Venus Proxima.

Sisters of Parvos 
The Sisters of Parvos expansion was released on July 6, 2021, introducing the eponymous Sisters of Parvos, the Corpus equivalent to the Grineer Kuva Liches, who function in a similar way to them. The Sisters of Parvos are members of Parvos Granum's board of directors, given unusual powers of immortality that must be broken in the same way as a Kuva Lich. The Sisters are armed with upgraded versions of standard Corpus weapons and are accompanied by a robotic Hound which serves as the equivalent of Kuva Thralls. The expansion also introduced some changes to the way the player combats their Lich or Sister, with the enemy fleeing to one of the Proxima regions upon their "Requiem" sequence being completed, requiring the player to take them on in a short Railjack sequence before boarding their ship for the final confrontation. The Expansion also introduced the 47th Warframe Yareli, who has an aquatic theme, as well as special "Galvanised" mods for ranged weapons due to player complaints that they weren't performing as well as their melee counterparts in high-level content.

The New War 
The New War expansion was released on December 15, 2021. The New War quest follows after The Sacrifice and Prelude to The New War. Ballas, along with Hunhow's son Erra wage war against the entire Origin System, prompting former enemies to become allies against a heavy threat, but all is lost after the Sentients successfully manage to take down the alliance. A new empire is born, named Narmer, and its influence becomes consequential. Ordis, now with an ally, must find the Operator and end Ballas for good. This quest will open to more questions regarding the philosophy of time, as well as answer the reason why the Operator owes the 'Man in the Wall'. Acquisition of a Railjack and a Necramech, as well completion of some previous quests, is required to play The New War.

Angels of the Zariman
Adding to the ongoing theme of temporal paradoxes, the Zariman returns to the Origin System. The ship, which was previously thought to be destroyed, is now haunted by spectral Void entities, including "Angels", towering, humanoid Void abominations. This update also overhauls several basic enemy classes, notably Eximus enemies, making them much more resistant to damage and overall more dangerous, and deeply changes the Focus system and Operator gameplay to integrate them more with general Warframe gameplay. The Tenno are tasked by the resurrected crew of the Zariman to protect the ship from being overrun by Void entities and external invaders (Corpus and Grineer troops) while helping them piece together their memories of the destruction of the original Zariman ship. This update also introduced the 49th Warframe Gyre, as well as a unique class of transforming weapons known as "Incarnon" weapons, alongside unique "Voidshell" cosmetic skins for Warframes, allowing players to pick out different materials for an added layer of customisation.

Veilbreaker 
The Veilbreaker expansion was released on September 7, 2022. The expansion features the return of Grineer soldier Kahl-175, previously playable during the New War quest. After freeing himself from Narmer control, Kahl, with the help of Daughter Entrati and the Tenno, has emerged as the Origin System's newest hero, intending to 'break Narmer' by freeing its captives, disrupting their operations and destroying their armies. Kahl is playable during weekly "Break Narmer" missions and features a more traditional cover shooter style of gameplay, in contrast to the fast movement and parkour of the Tenno. The expansion also introduces Kahl's Garrison, a camp on Earth founded by Kahl as both a base of operations and a settlement for any captives freed during Kahl's missions. Here, the player is able to customise Kahl with various colors, materials and armor pieces, as well as purchase items in exchange for Stock, a trading currency collected from completing challenges during "Break Narmer" missions. Veilbreaker also introduces Archon Hunts, difficult missions where players must hunt down and defeat the Archons, monstrous Sentient-Warframe hybrids created during the Old War, previously fought as bosses during the New War quest. Veilbreaker also made several quality-of-life changes to certain game functions, introduced the 50th Warframe, the Spartan-inspired Styanax, and distributed him for free for a limited time between 7 and 21 September to celebrate this milestone.

Reception

Warframe received "mixed or average reviews" on the PlayStation 4, Xbox One, and PC, while the Nintendo Switch and PlayStation 5 versions received "generally favorable reviews", according to the review aggregation website Metacritic. GameZone's Mike Splechta said of the PlayStation 4 version, "If you already enjoy games like Monster Hunter which require you to farm for items in order to craft better ones, Warframe follows that very same formula, except with much more satisfying and faster-paced combat." However, as of 2018 PC Gamer said that "Warframe's growth doesn't resemble a well-tended plant—it's more like a mutant science experiment. Game systems are haphazardly stitched onto one other in ways that are sometimes incoherent, but oddly charming all the same."

The game is one of the most-played games available on Steam. Digital Extremes attributes the success of the title by being a F2P game. Digital Extremes describes the game as a "rogue success", as the game is able to secure and sustain a large number of players without gaining significant attention from other people. More than 26 million players had played the game since launch by April 2016, and by March 2018, five years from its open beta, had reached 38 million players. The game had nearly 50 million players by the time of its sixth anniversary. In July 2016, Digital Extremes launched its first Warframe-dedicated convention, "TennoCon", in London, Ontario, drawing 1000 players, where they announced news of upcoming features and updates to the game. Digital Extremes have been running the event annually ever since.

The game was nominated for "Best Ongoing Game" at The Game Awards 2017, and won the People's Voice Award for "Action" at the 2018 Webby Awards. It was also nominated for the "Still Playing Award" at the 2018 Golden Joystick Awards, and for "Fan Favorite Shooter Game" and "Fan Favorite Fall Release" with Fortuna at the Gamers' Choice Awards. At the 2019 Webby Awards, the game again won the Peoples Voice Awards for "Action Game" and "Best Sound Design". It was nominated for "Best Game Expansion" with Empyrean and for the "Still Playing" award at the 2019 Golden Joystick Awards.

References

External links
 
 

2013 video games
Action role-playing video games
Artificial intelligence in fiction
Cooperative video games
Fiction about corporate warfare
Cyborgs in fiction
Discrimination in fiction
Fiction about assassinations
Fiction about consciousness transfer
Fiction set on Phobos (moon)
Free-to-play video games
Fiction about invasions
Loot shooters
Multiplayer and single-player video games
Multiplayer online games
Nanotechnology in fiction
Nintendo Switch games
PlayStation 4 Pro enhanced games
PlayStation 4 games
PlayStation 5 games
Propaganda in fiction
Fiction about rebellions
Fiction about robots
Science fiction video games
Fiction about outer space
Third-person shooters
Transhumanism in fiction
Video games about ninja
Video games about robots
Video games about spirit possession
Video games about viral outbreaks
Video games adapted into comics
Video games developed in Canada
Video games set in outer space
Video games set in the future
Video games set on fictional planets
Video games using PhysX
Video games with Steam Workshop support
Video games with customizable avatars
Video games with expansion packs
War video games
Windows games
Works about child soldiers
Works based on Investiture of the Gods
Xbox One games
Xbox Series X and Series S games